4060 Deipylos  is a large Jupiter trojan from the Greek camp, approximately  in diameter. It was discovered on 17 December 1987, by astronomers Eric Elst and Guido Pizarro at ESO's La Silla Observatory in northern Chile. The transitional C-type asteroid belongs to the 40 largest Jupiter trojans and has rotation period of 9.3 hours. It was named after Deipylos from Greek mythology.

Orbit and classification 

Deipylos is a dark Jovian asteroid orbiting in the leading Greek camp at Jupiter's  Lagrangian point, 60° ahead its orbit in a 1:1 resonance (see Trojans in astronomy). It is a non-family asteroid in the Jovian background population. It orbits the Sun at a distance of 4.4–6.1 AU once every 12.03 years (4,392 days; semi-major axis of 5.25 AU). Its orbit has an eccentricity of 0.15 and an inclination of 16° with respect to the ecliptic.

Physical characteristics 

Deipylos has been characterized as a carbonaceous C-type asteroid in the Tholen-like taxonomy of the Small Solar System Objects Spectroscopic Survey (S3OS2). In their SMASS-like taxonomy, S3OS2 classified Deipylos as an Cb-subtype that transitions to the somewhat brighter B-type asteroids. The Collaborative Asteroid Lightcurve Link also assumes it to be of carbonaceous composition.

Rotation period 

In December 2010, a rotational lightcurve of Deipylos was obtained from photometric observations in the R-band by astronomers at the Palomar Transient Factory in California. Lightcurve analysis gave a rotation period of 11.490 hours with a brightness amplitude of 0.11	 magnitude Between 2015 and 2017, several observations by Robert Stephens in collaboration with Daniel Coley and Brian Warner at the Center for Solar System Studies  in California gave a more refined period between 9.19 and 9.38 hours and an amplitude of 0.07–0.13 magnitude. The best-rated result gave 9.298 hours with an amplitude of  magnitude.

Diameter and albedo 

According to the surveys carried out by the Infrared Astronomical Satellite IRAS, the Japanese Akari satellite and the NEOWISE mission of NASA's Wide-field Infrared Survey Explorer, Deipylos measures between 79.21 and 86.79 kilometers in diameter and its surface has an albedo between 0.043 and 0.078. CALL assumes a standard albedo for a carbonaceous asteroid of 0.057 and calculates a diameter of 66.34 kilometers based on an absolute magnitude of 9.62.

Naming 

This minor planet was named after Deipylos a Greek hero in the Trojan War. He was a fellow of Sthenelus (Sthenelos), who ordered him to bring the horses captured from Aeneas to the Greek vessels. The official naming citation was published by the Minor Planet Center on 15 September 1989.

Notes

References

External links 
 Asteroid Lightcurve Database (LCDB), query form (info )
 Dictionary of Minor Planet Names, Google books
 Discovery Circumstances: Numbered Minor Planets (1)-(5000) – Minor Planet Center
 
 

004060
004060
Discoveries by Eric Walter Elst
Discoveries by Guido Pizarro (astronomer)
Named minor planets
19871217